Man with the Golden Winchester (also known as Son of Zorro) is a 1973 Spaghetti Western-adventure film directed by  Gianfranco Baldanello and starring Alberto Dell'Acqua  and Fernando Sancho.

Plot 
The young nobleman Don Ricardo Villaverde lives in Mexico, which is ruled by Emperor Maximilian and led by Governor Leblanche as his very enjoyable representative Son of Zorro, a fighter for the poor peons and rebels suffering under the governor and thus for the revolution. When a load of weapons is on its way to the Alcalde of the town of San Ramon, Don Herrera Coser, the transport is attacked by the rebel Garincha and Herrera is killed; his daughter Donna Conchita escapes with the help of the son of Zoro and is hidden by him. They both fall in love. Meanwhile, the weapons become the property of the rebels who equip the peons with them and the revolution begins, causing the governor and his wife to flee. The son of Zorro, who made all these happenings possible and supported, goes to the house of the unhappily married Conchita and reveals himself to her.

Cast 
 Alberto Dell'Acqua (credited as Robert Widmark)  as Don Rocardo Villaverde (Zorro)
 Fernando Sancho as  Col. Michel Leblanche
 Elisa Ramírez as Conchita Herrera
 William Berger as  Mathias Boyd
 George Wang as  Pedro Garincha
 Dada Gallotti as  Mathilde Leblanche
 Franco Fantasia  as Captain François Bardeau
 Marina Malfatti as  Mathilda

See also
 List of Italian films of 1973

References

External links
 

1973 films
Spanish Western (genre) films
Spaghetti Western films
1973 Western (genre) films
Zorro films
Films directed by Gianfranco Baldanello
Films with screenplays by Joaquín Luis Romero Marchent
Films based on works by Johnston McCulley
1970s American films
1970s Italian films
1970s Spanish films